Dedimar Souza Lima (born 27 January 1976) is a Brazilian former professional footballer and manager who is currently a youth scout for Palmeiras.

Club statistics

References

External links

1976 births
Living people
Brazilian footballers
Brazilian football managers
Brazilian expatriate footballers
Expatriate footballers in Japan
Campeonato Brasileiro Série A players
Campeonato Brasileiro Série B players
J1 League players
J2 League players
Brazil under-20 international footballers
Campeonato Brasileiro Série D managers
Esporte Clube Vitória players
Sociedade Esportiva Palmeiras players
Clube Atlético Mineiro players
Júbilo Iwata players
Coritiba Foot Ball Club players
Paulista Futebol Clube players
Esporte Clube Santo André players
Tokyo Verdy players
Marília Atlético Clube players
Associação Desportiva São Caetano players
Clube Atlético Juventus players
Paulista Futebol Clube managers
Esporte Clube Santo André managers
Association football defenders